Galiano Island (Hul'qumi'num: Swiikw) is one of the Southern Gulf Islands located between Vancouver Island and the Lower Mainland of British Columbia, Canada. Located on the west side of the Strait of Georgia, the island is bordered by Mayne Island to the southeast, Salt Spring Island to the west and Valdes Island to the northwest. Galiano is part of the Capital Regional District Electoral Area G, and has a permanent population of 1,396 inhabitants as of 2021.

Galiano takes its name from Spanish explorer Dionisio Alcalá Galiano, who explored the area in 1792.

History

Prior to the arrival of Europeans, Galiano Island was long inhabited by Indigenous peoples from the Penelakut First Nation as well as other Coast Salish peoples. Midden pits at Montague Harbour suggest at least 3,000 years of habitation, with one study dating the earliest signs of permanent occupation in the island's proximities to over 5000 years ago. A complex culture, heavily reliant on the native Cedar trees, flourished on the island. In the late 1770s, the smallpox epidemic reached the Coast Salish region, reducing the region's population by as much as 30%. Subsequent outbreaks would reduce the First Nations population even further. By the time Captain Galiano arrived in the area in the late 18th century, the First Nations population had been greatly reduced.

By the 19th Century, with European colonization of North America well under way, the area around Galiano remained relatively undisturbed. However, when news of the discovery of gold on the British Columbia mainland reached San Francisco in 1858, nearby Victoria became an important port for miners on their way to the Fraser Canyon gold fields. Due to increased interest and in the area from white settlers, the Royal Navy hydrographer Captain George Henry Richards was tasked with mapping the Southern Gulf Islands in 1859, and decided to name the island in honour of the Spanish navigator who had visited the region 67 years prior.

In the early years of European settlement the island's primary industries were fishing and logging. Poor soil on the island limited the development of widespread agriculture found on other Gulf Islands, such as nearby Salt Spring. Early settlement included a pioneer farming community on the shores of “Plumper Pass” (later renamed Active Pass). Other settlers, such as Scotty Georgeson (a Shetland Islander), also held land and had family on Galiano in this period.

Beginning in the 1870s a small number of Asian immigrants, particularly Japanese, also decided to settle the area for its abundance of fish stock and timber. These Japanese immigrants, primarily from Wakayama Prefecture, brought with them methods of charcoal production, whose evidence can still be found on the island today. Many of these Japanese settlers continued to operate salteries on the north end of the island until the outbreak of war with Japan.

Following confederation of British Columbia into Canada in 1871 and the subsequent the completion of the Canadian Pacific Railway in 1885, the nearby Lower Mainland exploded in population. By 1928 this had spilled over, and the small community on Galiano had grown large enough to construct the Galiano Community hall, which is still in use today. In the 1960s logging rights for much of the island were given to MacMillan Bloedel for resource extraction. Many environmentally conscious residents objected to the widespread logging, leading to many disputes including MacMillan Bloedel Ltd. v. Galiano Island Trust Committee in 1995. Environmentalism and the 1960s counter-culture continue to heavily influence the culture of the island to this day. In 2011, the riding of Saanich—Gulf Islands, to which Galiano is a part, elected Canada's first Green member of parliament, Elizabeth May.

As of the 21st century, the logging industry has all but halted on the island, replaced by industries such as tourism and a local art scene.

Caroline Shaw has said about her composition The Evergreen, “One day in January 2020, I took a walk in an evergreen forest on Swiikw (Galiano Island), British Columbia, Canada. I found myself slowing down. My steps were shorter, less frequent. I stopped trying to get to my destination with any real intention or speed. Eventually I stopped moving altogether. I looked, and listened, and felt and smelled and breathed. Like a thousand thousand creatures before me there, some of them also human, I paused and wondered and thought, "There is wisdom in these trees." It's been said before, in ways more eloquent and complex than my little story here. Still.”

Geography 

The summit provides hikers with views over the Gulf Islands, the United States San Juan Islands and the distant mainland mountains as well.

The western coast of the island (facing Trincomali Channel) is characterized by its unique sandstone formations and caves.

Climate

The climate of Galiano Island is classified as warm-summer Mediterranean climate (Csb) under the Köppen climate classification system, characterized by cool, wet winters and warm, dry summers. Similar to the other Gulf Islands, the rain shadow effect of the Olympic and Vancouver Island mountains, and the moderating effects of the ocean, are the dominant influences on the climate of Galiano Island. Galiano Island experiences an annual moisture deficit from mid-June to early October due to the combined effects of seasonal dry, sunny and warm weather. This deficit can often reach drought conditions in areas of recent clearcuts and can result in an extreme forest fire hazard in the summer months.

Ecology

Due to its mild climate and position in a confluence between two different tidal systems, Galiano Island is home to a large variety of fauna and flora, which have been heavily sampled by science. In a 2022 article published as the first volume in a 5-part overview of the island's biodiversity, researchers reported "over 4000 taxa recorded to date, including avian, freshwater, marine and terrestrial species".

In a major flight path for migrating birds, Galiano has hundreds of bird species, such as bald eagles, herons and cormorants. Off its shores are resident and transient populations of orca whales, seals, otters, and sea lions, as well as many other varieties of sea life, including at least 214 species of molluscs, 86 species of crustaceans, 82 species of ray-finned or cartilagenous fish, 41 species of echinoderms, 40 species of sea sponges, 77 species of cnidarians, six species of ribbon worms and four species of ctenophores. The island is also home to a large population of deer.

Of the 19 reef complexes mapped throughout the Salish Sea, the waters off Galiano Island are home to one of the most extensive ones, with large populations of cloud sponges and Heterochone calyx being recorded, as well as a high diversity of marine animal species.

Many native tree species such as arbutus trees, western red cedar and Coast Douglas-fir thrive on the island and can be found in abundance. While most of the island has been logged in the years since European settlement, limited old-growth forests still exist, for example on the southern side of Bluffs Park.

Transportation

Galiano Island is accessible by vehicle via the BC Ferries terminal at Sturdies Bay, located on Active Pass. Vehicle and passenger ferry service runs from Tsawwassen (Vancouver) on the mainland and Swartz Bay (Victoria) on Vancouver Island most days of the year. Additionally, there are numerous inter-island ferries that connect the Gulf Islands, which are scheduled less frequently.

Moorage is available at several public wharves for boat traffic: Sturdies Bay, (walking distance to the village), Montague Harbour, Whalers Bay and Retreat Cove. Private moorage is available at Montague Harbour Marina and the Galiano Oceanfront Inn (Sturdies Bay). Limited water taxi service to nearby islands like Salt Spring is also available out of Sturdies Bay and Montague Harbour.

Daily, regularly scheduled floatplane service is offered from Downtown Vancouver and the Vancouver International Water Airport through Seair Seaplanes to Montague Harbour. There is regularly scheduled floatplane service from Seattle daily through Kenmore Air, either through Seattle-Tacoma International Airport, Kenmore Air Harbor and Seattle Lake Union.

Once on the island, most areas can be accessed by paved road, however some logging roads remain in use in the less travelled sections of the island.

Parks 
Galiano is home to many popular public parks like Montague Harbour and Dionisio as well as privately owned parks such as Tapovan Peace Park.

Montague Harbour Marine Provincial Park is one of the most popular parks in the Gulf Islands. Its Shell Beach is a west-facing beach with worn shells covering the whole expanse of the beach instead of sand. For thousands of years, it was the location of a midden used by Coast Salish people. Montague Harbour is popular with the recreational boating community; the harbour is often crowded with yachts and sailboats during the warmer months of June, July, and August. The park's mooring buoys are in limited supply and cannot be reserved, but the harbour is well sheltered if one chooses to anchor. A marina with moorage, gas dock, several small stores, and a cafe (summer only) is located at the southern end of the harbour. A public dock is near the marina.
Dionisio Point Provincial Park is a boat-access and walk in only, rugged natural park at the north end of the island with beaches that the local islanders call Coon Bay. It has a shoreline with sandstone formations, a sandy beach for swimming, tidal pools, colourful wildflowers, and forests.
Bellhouse Provincial Park is notable for spring wildflowers and its views of marine life and snow-capped mountains.
Bluffs Park is Galiano's oldest wilderness park, established by community subscription in 1948. With , it extends far inland into virgin forest, as well having high cliffs and a long sandy beach.
Mount Galiano is Galiano's highest point. The top provides hikers with views over the Gulf Islands, the U.S. San Juan Islands, and the distant mainland mountains.
Collinson Point Provincial Park is the shoreline of Mount Galiano, and is important in protecting the marine life of the approaches to Active Pass.
High cliffs are home to raptors like peregrine falcons and bald eagles, as well as trees like cedars and Douglas fir.
Tapovan, Sri Chinmoy Peace Park is a 200-acre privately owned park, opened in 2013, honouring Sri Chinmoy (1931-2007). It features many hiking trails named by the word "peace", each in a different language, and a stairway ascending the high cliff.
Matthews Point Park is a  Capital Regional District Park that preserves over a kilometre of waterfront on Active Pass, of which 300 metres are broad sandy beach. It was named after a pioneer family whose descendants in England later contributed towards the Park purchase. There is also a hiking loop along the clifftops. It adjoins and is connected to Bluffs Park.
The Trincomali Nature Sanctuary is an area of sheer cliffs that has been set aside by the Islands Trust for the preservation of Double-crested cormorants and Peregrine Falcons, among other species.

Government
Government bodies that oversee the island include Federal, Provincial and the Capital Regional District as well as the Islands Trust whose mandate is to establish land-use bylaws to "preserve and protect" the island, most notably in terms of development. For most of the 20th century roughly half of the land on Galiano was owned by the logging firm MacMillan Bloedel. As a result, Galiano was not as extensively developed as neighbouring islands. When the firm sold its holdings on Galiano, debate about development issues sharpened, and the Islands Trust set minimum lot sizes to limit development.

Local elections are held every three years to determine who will be the island's two Trustees.

There is one Indian reserve on the island, Galiano Indian Reserve No. 9, located at the northern tip of the island operating under Penelakut administration.

Tourism 
Due to the minimal development of Galiano, tourism on the island has remained limited and sustainable. There are two proper hotels and several cabin resorts, but most accommodation comes in the form of Bed and Breakfasts, the Montague Provincial Park Campsite or holiday rentals. Activities on Galiano Island include hiking, boating, visiting art galleries, golfing and exploring beaches, as well as frequent musical events. Pilgrimme Restaurant, which focusses on local farm-to-table and foraged fare, attracts visitors from around the world seeking high-quality Pacific Northwest cuisine.

Infrastructure
The powerline HVDC Vancouver Island crosses Galiano Island in southwestly direction as overhead powerline section, which ends at a cable terminal on Parker Island.

Notable people

Brett Gaylor, documentary filmmaker 
Iona Campagnolo, former Lieutenant Governor of British Columbia
Jane Rule, American born Canadian writer 
Audrey Thomas, novelist and short story writer
Marie Clements, Métis playwright, performer, director, producer and screenwriter

Gallery

See also
List of islands of British Columbia

References

Further reading
Women in Fish Rosemary Georgeson & Marie Clements
Historical Charcoal Pit Kilns British Columbia Museums Association, Roundup Magazine #271, p. 16
Relacion del Viage de las Goletas Sutil y Mexicana Dionisio Alcala Galiano, Madrid, 1802. En la Imprenta Real. De Orden del Rey.
Galiano Archives Local history, back numbers of local paper etc.

External links

Galiano Island Chamber of Commerce incl. Island Information and Map
Galiano Trails Society (with maps)
Galiano Museum

 
Islands of the Gulf Islands